Terrapin Beer Company is a brewery founded in 2002 by Brian "Spike" Buckowski and John Cochran in Athens, Georgia, United States. In July 2016, Molson Coors announced its majority stake in Terrapin, ending its status as a craft brewery.

History

Founders John Cochran, a 1993 University of Georgia graduate, and Brian "Spike" Buckowski a 1996 American Brewers Guild (California) graduate - met in 1998 while working at Atlanta Brewing Company. Both men had been homebrewing for years, and decided to partner with each other to start a brewing company in Athens, Georgia. Buckowski, a Grateful Dead fan, named the brewery after his favorite Grateful Dead album Terrapin Station. After creating a business plan, Buckowski and Cochran spent three unsuccessful years pitching investors to fund their startup costs for the Terrapin Brewing Company. In April 2002, they created and introduced Terrapin's Rye Pale Ale at the Classic City Brew Fest in Athens, Georgia - which garnered praise by beer aficionados across the U.S. In October 2002, its Rye Pale Ale was awarded the American Pale Ale Gold Medal at the Great American Beer Festival in Denver, Colorado - which helped garner Terrapin distribution opportunities across Atlanta. Terrapin began contract brewing with several breweries to produce their beer including; Frederick Brewing Company (now Flying Dog Brewery) in Frederick, Maryland, and Zuma Brewing Company in Atlanta, Georgia.

In 2006, Terrapin obtained an $800,000 investment from a pool of Athens' investors, which allowed them to buy brewing equipment and lease a small facility in Athens, Georgia where they began producing their own beer. In 2008, the brewery moved to a larger 45,000 square-foot facility at 265 Newton Bridge Road, Athens, Georgia, where it could produce up to 18,500 barrels per year.  Terrapin Brewing Company offers tastings and tours and averages 30,000 visitors per year.

Beers

Year Round Beers

Hopsecutioner IPA, ABV: 7.3%, IBU: 71, O.G. 16.3

Hi-5 IPA, ABV: 5.9%, IBU: 80, O.G. 13.9
RecreationAle Session IPA, ABV: 4.7%, O.G. 11

Seasonal Sessions
Mosaic Red Rye IPA, ABV: 6.3%, IBU: 75, O.G. 14.4
Maggie's Farmhouse Ale, ABV: 5.3%, IBU: 22, O.G. 11.5
Pumpkinfest,  ABV: 6.1%, IBU: 14.5, O.G. 14.5
Moo-Hoo, ABV: 6.0%, IBU: 30, O.G. 13.7

Monster Beer Tour
Hop Selection, ABV: 8.7%, IBU: 80, O.G. 18.5
Wake 'N' Bake, ABV: 8.6%, IBU: 50, O.G. 20.8

Ownership 

In 2011, Terrapin Beer Co. sold a minority interest of less than 25% to MillerCoors's craft and import division Tenth and Blake Beer Company a subsidiary of Molson Coors The minority ownership was given in exchange for reducing a loan made by Tenth and Blake Beer Company in December 2010 to buy out a group of Terrapin investors. In a 2013 interview, co-founder John Cochran claimed that the financing agreement between Tenth and Blake Beer Company and Terrapin Beer Co. did not include equity. He claimed that co-founders Cochran and Buckowski owned more of the company than they had prior to the Tenth and Blake deal. Nevertheless, on July 20, 2016, MillerCoors announced that it had taken a majority interest in Terrapin Beer Co. through its Tenth and Blake Beer Company division. The transaction was completed in August 2016.

References

External links

Athens Banner-Herald Newspaper Article
"Terrapin Signs Lease for New Brewery"

Beer brewing companies based in Georgia (U.S. state)
Companies based in Athens, Georgia
2002 establishments in Georgia (U.S. state)
Companies established in 2002